The 1994 Uganda Cup season was the 20th season of the main Ugandan football cup.

Overview
The competition was known as the Kakungulu Cup and was won by Express Red Eagles who beat Kampala City Council FC 4-3 on penalties in the final.  The results are not available for the earlier rounds

Final

Footnotes

External links
 Uganda - List of Cup Finals - RSSSF (Mikael Jönsson, Ian King and Hans Schöggl)

Ugandan Cup
Uganda Cup
Cup